Daniela "Danni" Di Toro (born 16 October 1974) is an Australian wheelchair tennis and table tennis player. Di Toro was the 2010 French Open doubles champion and has also been the Masters double champion. In singles, Di Toro is the former world number one and two time masters finalist. In 2015, she moved to para-table tennis and represented Australia at the 2016 Rio Paralympics, where she was team captain with Kurt Fearnley. At the  2020 Tokyo Paralympics, her sixth Paralympics, she was the team captain and Opening Ceremony flag bearer with Ryley Batt.

Personal life
Daniela Di Toro was born on 16 October 1974 in Melbourne, Victoria.  She became a paraplegic in 1988 in an accident while competing at a school swimming carnival, when a wall fell on her. While in hospital, following her accident, Di Toro met Sandy Blythe, a member of the Australian Rollers.  He inspired her to continue to pursue sports.  She lives in the Melbourne suburb of Thornbury and she works as a youth worker in Melbourne. She graduated from Victoria University with a Bachelor of Chinese Medicine (Acupuncture and Herbs) in 2009.

In 2017, she was appointed Paralympics Australia's Athlete Engagement and Wellbeing Officer, and Vice Chairperson of the Athlete Commission.

Wheelchair tennis

In wheelchair tennis, Di Toro is classified as Paraplegic T12/L1.  She first started playing tennis when she was nine. She started playing wheelchair tennis in 1988, and started representing Australia in 1989, winning the Australian Open in 1991 – it would be her first of ten Australian Open titles. Internationally, she has been ranked as high as number one. She was once a scholarship holder at the Victorian Institute of Sport. As a professional tennis player, Di Toro has won more than three hundred matches. She is coached by Greg Crump. She trains at the Tennis Centre and Nunawading. Her club tennis is with Wheelchair Sport Victoria.

At the end of the 2010 season, Di Toro was ranked second in the world. During the 2010 season, she reached the quarterfinals of the Australian Open, semifinals of the French Open and finals of the US Open. In 2010, she won the Japan Open and the Korean Open. In 2010, Di Toro competed in the women's double tennis events at the four major tennis events.  Her partners were Lucy Shuker of Great Britain and Aniek Van Koot of Holland. Di Toro was injured in 2011, and had to pull out of the French and Korean Opens because her neck was inflamed.  The injury happened while she was competing at the Japanese Open and was a herniated disc.

Paralympics
Di Toro has competed as wheelchair tennis player in 4 consecutive Paralympic Games: Atlanta 1996, Sydney 2000, Athens 2004 and Beijing 2008. She won a silver medal at the 2000 Sydney Games in the Women's Doubles event, with Branka Pupovac as her partner. She won a bronze medal at the 2004 Games in the Women's singles event. She competed at the 2008 Paralympics, and was the only female wheelchair tennis player on the Australian team.

Kobe Open
Di Toro won the Kobe Open in 2003 in the women's singles event.

Retirement
In 2005, Di Toro retired from competitive tennis in order to spend more time studying Chinese medicine. She would end her career with 2 US Open titles, the 2000 Wheelchair Tennis Masters Doubles title, and a silver and bronze Paralympic medal. Following her 2005 retirement, she continued to be active in the wheelchair tennis community by coaching young tennis players.

Return from retirement
In January 2007, Di Toro came out of retirement to compete in the Australian Open's Wheelchair Tennis Super Series event where she lost in the first round. She would have more success in doubles, where she made the semi-finals with partner Lucy Shuker. She made her first finals appearance after retirement at Wimbledon in 2009. She would go on to make 6 straight finals including winning the 2010 French Open, beating Esther Vergeer and Sharon Walraven. She also made two finals appearances in singles, at the 2010 US Open and 2011 Australian Open. In 2010, she made the finals of the Wheelchair Tennis Masters in singles.

Table Tennis

She is a Class 4 table tennis player. In April 2015, Toro dominated in the C3-5 competition at the International Table Tennis Federation (ITTF) Oceania Para-Table Tennis Championships. This was her first international para-table tennis competition after her move from wheelchair tennis.

At the 2016 Rio Paralympics, she lost both matches in the Women's Singles Class 4 and failed to advance. At the 2019 Oceania Para Table Tennis Championships, Darwin, she won the gold medal in the Women's Class 2–5.

At the 2020 Tokyo Paralympics, she lost both matches in the Women's Singles Class 4 and failed to advance.

Di Toro competed at the 2022 Commonwealth Games in the Women's singles C3-5 but did nor progress past the group stage.

Recognition

In 1999, Di Toro was named the Australian Paralympian of the Year. In 2000, she received an Australian Sports Medal, and in 2001, she was named the Young Victorian of the Year. In 2010, she was nominated as the Most Outstanding athlete with a disability by Tennis Australia. She was appointed team captain with Kurt Fearnley for the Australian Team at the 2016 Rio Paralympics. In November 2019, Batt with Daniela di Toro was named co-captain of the Australian Team at the 2020 Tokyo Paralympics. On 23 August 2021, di Toro and Batt were announced as the flagbearers for the Australian team for the Tokyo 2020 Paralympics opening ceremony. In 2022, she was awarded Paralympics Australia President’s Award.

Performance timelines

**To prevent confusion, this table only includes the events which took place from 2002 onwards at the Grand Slam venues.

Wheelchair singles

Wheelchair doubles

References

External links
 
 Table Tennis Australia Profile
 

1974 births
Living people
Australian female tennis players
Australian wheelchair tennis players
Acupuncturists
Wheelchair category Paralympic competitors
Paralympic wheelchair tennis players of Australia
Paralympic table tennis players of Australia
Paralympic medalists in wheelchair tennis
Paralympic silver medalists for Australia
Paralympic bronze medalists for Australia
Wheelchair tennis players at the 1996 Summer Paralympics
Wheelchair tennis players at the 2000 Summer Paralympics
Wheelchair tennis players at the 2004 Summer Paralympics
Wheelchair tennis players at the 2008 Summer Paralympics
Wheelchair tennis players at the 2012 Summer Paralympics
Table tennis players at the 2016 Summer Paralympics
Table tennis players at the 2020 Summer Paralympics
Table tennis players at the 2022 Commonwealth Games
Medalists at the 2000 Summer Paralympics
Medalists at the 2004 Summer Paralympics
People with paraplegia
Recipients of the Australian Sports Medal
Sportswomen from Victoria (Australia)
Victorian Institute of Sport alumni
Tennis players from Melbourne
ITF World Champions
20th-century Australian women
21st-century Australian women
Sportspeople from Melbourne